Chondrometopum leve is a species of ulidiid or picture-winged fly in the genus Chondrometopum of the family Ulidiidae.

References

Ulidiidae